is a Shinto shrine located on Mount Yoshino in Yoshino district, Nara, Japan.  It is closely associated with Emperor Go-Daigo.

Yoshino Mikumari Shrine is one of four important mikumari shrines in the former province Yamato. The shrine also houses six kami that are more or less related to mikumari (Takami-musubi-no-kami, Sukuna-hiko-no-kami, Mikogami, Ama-tsu-hiko-hi-no-ninigi-no-mikoto, Tamayori-hime-no-mikoto, and Yorozu-hata-toyo-akitsushi-hime-no-mikoto). A wooden statue of the deity Tamayori hime is registered as a National Treasure of Japan.

The present-day buildings go back to 1605, when Toyotomi Hideyori rebuilt the shrine, as his father Toyotomi Hideyoshi once had prayed here for a son and successor. The main hall (honden), an Important Cultural Property，is an unusual structure 9 ken long and 2 ken wide.  Built in the nagare-zukuri style, it has however an independent 1x1 ken unit in the kasuga-zukuri style at the center. The three resulting edifices all lie under the same bark roof, which has three dormer gables.

In 2004, it was designated as part of a UNESCO World Heritage Site under the name Sacred Sites and Pilgrimage Routes in the Kii Mountain Range.

See also
 List of Shinto shrines
 Twenty-Two Shrines
 List of National Treasures of Japan (sculptures)
 Modern system of ranked Shinto Shrines

Notes

References

 Ponsonby-Fane, Richard Arthur Brabazon. (1962).   Studies in Shinto and Shrines. Kyoto: Ponsonby Memorial Society. OCLC 399449
 . (1959).  The Imperial House of Japan. Kyoto: Ponsonby Memorial Society. OCLC 194887
 . (1964).  Visiting Famous Shrines in Japan. Kyoto: Ponsonby-Fane Memorial Society. 

Shinto shrines in Nara Prefecture
World Heritage Sites in Japan
Important Cultural Properties of Japan